Vjekoslava Huljić (born on 27 March 1963) is a Croatian lyricist, songwriter, novelist and writer. Born in Duvno and raised in Split, Huljić emerged as a successful lyricist with several hits of the Croatian group Magazin. She is considered to be one of the most productive and successful Croatian writers and lyricists and is most widely known for her collaborations with her husband and musician Tonči Huljić.

Her literary work targets both young and old audiences. In the span of her career, Huljić has written more than 600 songs, many of which have become best-selling singles of the respective artists they were written for, primarily Magazin, Jelena Rozga, Doris Dragović, Jole, Minea, Petar Grašo and Danijela Martinović. Her latest works with Lorena, Domenica and Tonči Huljić & Madre Badessa Band, include her writing using loanwords of the Dalmatian language.

Biography
Huljić was born as Vjekoslava Tolić in 1963 in Duvno to mother Iva Tolić, from Kolo, and father, Branko Tolić, a lawyer, from Imotski. Huljić is the middle one of three sisters. During her childhood, she moved to Split together with her parents. During her childhood, Vjekoslava Huljić followed piano classes for eleven years. Additionally, she used to play festival games with her sisters and perform songs by Italian singer-songwriter Sergio Endrigo in front of her parents. 

Huljić attended the priary school Bratstvo i jedinstvo in Split. As a very reserved and shy child, her family did not know whether she would adapt at communicating in school. Nevertheless, her teacher Kario Anka recognized her talent for writing and shared her work with the classes she was attending proclaiming "still waters run deep". In her adolescence, Huljić studied law at the University of Split. She only worked for four years in law as a judge trainee before switching to a more literary direction with poem, novel and songwriting.

Songwriting career
In 1981, Huljić debuted at the annual Zagrebfest with a song titled "Ne brini ništa". She continued her songwriting career with several songs from Magazin albums which was then still emerging as a band. Two of the biggest hits she wrote for the band while Ljiljana Nikolovska was still its lead singer were "Rano ranije", "Balkanska ulica" and "Ljube se dobri, loši, zli". On several of the earlier Magazin songs, she also worked together with Serbian songwriter Marina Tucaković. In 1991, when Nikolovska was leavaing the group, she was succeeded by Danijela Martinović; Huljić wrote several of the biggest hits she sang in the group, which include "Da mi te zaljubit u mene (Starimo dušo)", "Čari" and "Tišina" which were all included on the album Da mi te zaljubit u mene (1991). As the album was being released in the period of the Croatian War of Independence (1991-1995), she wrote the antiwar and peace-promoting song "Mir, mir, mir do neba". When Martinović embarked on a solo career, Huljić also served as one of the main songwriters of her songs "Zovem te ja" (1996) and "Da je slađe zaspati" (1998). She is also the songwriter of many top singles arranged and produced by her husband Tonči Huljić, a musician and a producer.

1986-onwards: Poem and novel writing 
She emerged as a writer in 1986, when she published her first collection of poems, titled Jutrooki. After that, she also published several children's books and novels. In 2020, she received the Anto Gardaš Prize for her novel Moj Titanic ne tone. In 2022, Vjekoslava Huljić presented her fourteenth book titled La Petite Marie by publisher Večernji list. The book, which takes place in Split and Paris, revolves around family life and the search for identity and roots. Upon its release, the book was described as the author's "most mature work yet".

Creative process
Describing her creative process, Huljić said in an interview "I was never attracted to camera lights. A writer creates in loneliness and silence, and the main role is his creation, not himself. I have always preferred to turn to my inner being and the lights of people which attract my attention". Discussing her songwriting process, Huljić has revealed that it usually starts with her husband composing a piece of music which elicits a certain type of emotion in her; she mostly uses paper to write songs while a computer she only uses to write books. At the beginning of their career, the duo was composing around 120 songs per year. As a writer, Vjekoslava Huljić has often produced lyrics that her husband considered to be "very literary" which he urged her to simplify. She also revealed during an interview that writing lyrics can take place during the evening as well and that she often dreams lyrics of her songs.

Personal life and accolades
Vjekoslava Huljić has received two Zlatno pero awards in the category of Best Young Literary Artist in primary school.

In 1987, Vjekoslava Huljić married Tonči Huljić, with whom she has two children, Ivan and Hana Huljić. The two met when they were 18 years old during a concert where Tonči was playing the piano; they dated for seven to eight years before they married when Vjekoslava was 26 years old. Despite their widespread popularity in Croatia and the wider Balkan region, the two kept their lives private and far from the media.

Artistry and legacy
Vjekoslava Huljić is considered to be among the ten most performed and most demanded Croatian authors. She was also dubbed the "favorite child author". In the span of her career, Vjekoslava Huljić has written more than 600 songs, 12 books and all the songs of 2 musicals. The most famous Croatian recording artists whose lyrics she has written include Magazin, Doris Dragović, Jelena Rozga, Petar Grašo, Danijela Martinović and Oliver Dragojević. Some other artists she has written for include Croatian singers Jole, Lorena, Domenica and Tonči Huljić & Madre Badessa Band. Huljić revealed that the biggest inspiration she draws is from the ordinary people of Dalmatia, the region where she lives, the Mediterranean lifestyle they have and any other life stories.

The lyrics of Vjekoslava Huljić's most famous song "Bižuterija", describe the experience of a dissatisfied woman who is left by her partner after having been treated as "bijouterie". The lyrics "žena, majka, kraljica" ("a woman, a mother, a queen") which are a part of the chorus became a catchphrase among the public on the Balkans, used to describe a powerful woman who can easily solve her life problems; the line is considered to be her most trademark lyric. The phrase gained widespread use among females who used it to support and empower each other. Other trademark lyrics she has written include "Bit' će bolje od ponedjeljka" ("It will be better from Monday onwards") from Danijela Martinović's "Život Stati Neće".

Literary works
 Jutrooki, poem collection (1986)
 Čampro, fable collection (2000)
 Maksove šumotvorine, novel (2002)
 Oči u oči s nebom, novel (2003)
 Lonac za čarolije, fabel collection (2007)
 Moj tata je lud za mnom, novel (2011)
 Moja baka ima dečka, novel (2013)
 Moja sestra je mrak, novel (2015)
 Moji misle da ja lažem, novel (2016)
 Moje ljeto s Picassom, children novel (2018)
 Moj Titanic ne tone, novel (2019)
 La Petite Marie (2022)

Selected discography
"Rano ranije", Magazin
"Balkanska ulica", Magazin
"Ljube se dobri, loši, zli", Magazin
"Dva put san umra", Oliver Dragojević (1995)
"Suze biserne", Jelena Rozga (1996)
"Zar je ljubav spala na to", Jelena Rozga featuring Tifa (2001)
"Providenca", Tonči Huljić & Madre Badessa (2014)
"Pismo-Glava", Jelena Rozga (2016)
"Ne Pijem, Ne Pušim", Jelena Rozga (2017)
"Ako te pitaju", Petar Grašo (2017)
"Sveto Pismo", Jelena Rozga (2020)

See also

Tonči Huljić
Music of Croatia
Popular music in Croatia
Popular music in Yugoslavia

References

External links 
 Vjekoslava Huljić at Diskografija.com
 Vjekoslava Huljić at Zamp.hr

Croatian novelists
Croats of Bosnia and Herzegovina
1963 births
Living people
People from Tomislavgrad
Croatian women novelists
University of Split alumni
Lyricists